Mios Num (aka: Num, Indonesian language: Pulau Mios Num) is an island of the Yapen Islands group, in Papua Province of Western New Guinea, northeastern Indonesia.    

It is in Cenderawasih Bay.  The Mios Num Strait separates it from Yapen island to the west.

Numfoor and Biak are to the north, with Aruri Strait in between.

Yapen Islands
Cenderawasih Bay
Islands of Western New Guinea
Landforms of Papua (province)
Islands of Indonesia
Uninhabited islands of Indonesia